Cornejo Rodolfo (born 7 September 1983) is a Chilean handball player for Santiago Steel and the Chilean national team.

References

1983 births
Living people
Chilean male handball players